Duke Street Records was a Canadian independent record label established in 1984 by Andrew Hermant, but the record label ceased operating in 1994.  The Universal Music Group took over the label when it halted operations.

The label released albums in a wide variety of genres by artists such as Art Bergmann, The Front,  Jane Siberry, FM, Rik Emmett, Willie P. Bennett, Rob McConnell, Scott Merritt, Chalk Circle, Valdy, Manteca, Don Ross, Eye Eye, Neo A4, and Barbara Lynch.

In 1995, Hermant donated his entire archive of Duke Street material to the Music Archives at the National Library of Canada. This 24-year collection includes over 2,100 audio tapes and a 30 cm stack of textual records, including promotional material and photographs.

References

See also 
 List of record labels

Record labels established in 1984
Canadian independent record labels
Defunct record labels of Canada
Record labels disestablished in 1994